Enterprise High School is a public high school in Enterprise, Oregon, United States.

Academics
In 2008, 92% of the school's seniors received their high school diploma. Of 39 students, 36 graduated, 0 dropped out, and 3 were still in high school the next year.
Notable graduates include Sarah Madsen of Portland, Oregon and Emma Hall of Paris, France.

References

External links
 Enterprise High School Profile

High schools in Wallowa County, Oregon
Public middle schools in Oregon
Public high schools in Oregon
Buildings and structures in Enterprise, Oregon